A Boot and a Shoe is the tenth studio album released by American singer and songwriter, Sam Phillips. The album was released in April 2004 and produced by T Bone Burnett.

Track listing

Personnel 
source:
 Sam Phillips – vocals, guitar
 Chris Bruce – guitar
 Marc Ribot – guitar
 Patrick Warren – piano, field organ, pump organ
 T Bone Burnett – bass guitar
 Mike Elizondo – bass guitar
 David Piltch – bass guitar
 Carla Azar – drums
 Jay Bellerose – drums
 Jim Keltner – drums
 The Section Quartet
 Eric Gorfain – violin
 Daphne Chen – violin
 Leah Katz – viola
 Richard Dodd – cello

References 

Sam Phillips (musician) albums
2004 albums
Albums produced by T Bone Burnett
Nonesuch Records albums